Arthur Gustave Sorlie (April 26, 1874 – August 28, 1928) was an American businessman and politician who served as the 14th Governor of North Dakota from 1925 until his death in 1928 at the age of 54.

Biography

Sorlie was born in Albert Lea, Minnesota and resided in Grand Forks, North Dakota. He was the son of Iver Jacobson Sorlie (1835-1916) and Maren Oline Olson (1841-1917), both immigrants from Norway.  He graduated from Luther Academy at Albert Lea, Minnesota in 1893.   He worked in a bank and managed a general store in Buxton, North Dakota. In 1903, Sorlie opened a bread and cracker factory in Grand Forks, North Dakota. He became a successful businessman, owning car dealerships and gas stations. Sorlie first entered politics as a member of the Grand Forks City Council, a position he held two terms.

Career

Sorlie defeated incumbent Ragnvald A. Nestos in the 1924 gubernatorial race. At that time, North Dakota politics involved the struggle between the Nonpartisan League (NPL) and the Independent Voters Association (IVA). The NPL membership (primarily farm and rural) bitterly opposed big business interests. They favored state-owned industries such as the Bank of North Dakota and the State Mill and Elevator. The IVA did not support state ownership of industry. They considered the NPL platform to be too radical and socialist.

When NPL-backed Sorlie replaced IVA candidate Nestos, the Nonpartisan League returned to power in the state. However, Sorlie did not have complete support from the League. Some (such as his own lieutenant governor, Walter Maddock) opposed Sorlie because he was a conservative businessman. During the 1927 legislative session, Sorlie's political enemies conspired to embarrass him by publicly investigating the State Mill and Elevator and calling for its removal from the governor's influence because of inefficient management.

Personal life
In 1900, he was married to Jennie Odegard  (1879-1918) with whom he had three children. After the death of his first wife, he married Grace Hilleboe  (1889-1965) with whom he had an additional three children. When Governor Sorlie died in office in 1928, his body lay in state in the rotunda of the North Dakota State Capitol. He is buried in Memorial Park Cemetery in Grand Forks, Grand Forks County, North Dakota.

Legacy
The Sorlie Memorial Bridge in Grand Forks, North Dakota was named in his memory. The Arthur G. Sorlie Papers were deposited in the Orin G. Libby Manuscript Collection in the Chester Fritz Library at the University of North Dakota.

References

Further reading

Sobel, Robert, and John Raimo, eds. Biographical Directory of the Governors of the United States, 1789-1978, Vol. 3 (Westport, Conn.; Meckler Books, 4 vols. 1978)

External links
 
National Governors Association

1874 births
1928 deaths
Republican Party governors of North Dakota
Politicians from Grand Forks, North Dakota
American Lutherans
American people of Norwegian descent
North Dakota city council members
People from Albert Lea, Minnesota
Nonpartisan League state governors of the United States
20th-century American politicians